"Ashes" is the second single from English rock band Embrace's fourth studio album, Out of Nothing. This release was publicised by a fan campaign called G.A.T.N.O (Get Ashes to Number One). The song reached number 11. "Ashes" was released to American radio on 1 March 2005. The B-side, "Flaming Red Hair", started life as a cover version of Michael Jackson's "Thriller". Another B-side, "How Come", is a cover of the D12 song of the same name and was originally performed on Jo Whiley's BBC Radio 1 show.

Track listings
7-inch
 "Ashes"
 "Enough"

CD1
 "Ashes" – 4:23
 "Maybe I Wish" – 5:25

CD2
 "Ashes"
 "Flaming Red Hair"
 "How Come" (live)
 "Ashes" (video)

Certifications

In popular culture
On 14 August 2014, Reading F.C. fans chose "Ashes" as their official club anthem.

"Ashes" can be heard in the film Kingsman: The Golden Circle (2017), where it is implied that Embrace are headlining the Pyramid stage at Glastonbury Festival.

The instrumental version of the song was used in BBC's Match of the Day Goal of the Month segment for the 2004-05 season.

References

2004 singles
2004 songs
Embrace (English band) songs
Independiente (record label) singles
Songs written by Danny McNamara
Songs written by Richard McNamara